Liberec Town Hall is a large building in the town of Liberec, Czech Republic.

Liberec town hall is a Neo-Renaissance building, which was built from 1888 till 1893 by design of the Viennese architect, Franz Neumann, replacing earlier structures dating to 1602.

The building has a richly decorated façade, integrated artwork, and very rare stained glass windows. Above the entrance portal is a sculptural relief by Viennese sculptor Theodor Friedl, showing the establishment of the old and new town hall. At its center is a female figure symbolizing the city; on the left side, figures associated with the original town hall, and figures associated with the emergence of a new town hall on the right, including the architect Neumann.

The front of the building is a bronze monument in the shape of a tank strip, commemorating nine victims of the invasion of the Warsaw Pact armies in August 1968.

The tower is 65 metres tall. Liberec town hall is similar to Vienna town hall. Today Liberec Town Hall is the seat of The Municipal Authority.

References 

City and town halls in the Czech Republic
Renaissance Revival architecture in the Czech Republic
Buildings and structures in Liberec
Tourist attractions in the Liberec Region